The 1961 Illinois Fighting Illini football team was an American football team that represented the University of Illinois during the 1961 Big Ten Conference football season. In their second year under head coach Pete Elliott, the Illini compiled a 0–9 record and finished in last place in the Big Ten Conference. Guard Tony Parrilli was selected as the team's most valuable player.

Schedule

References

Illinois
Illinois Fighting Illini football seasons
College football winless seasons
Illinois Fighting Illini football